Joe Ashman (born 17 August 1994) is an English actor, known for his roles as Callum on the Netflix series Free Rein and Rex on the iPlayer series Get Even.

Career
In 2014, Ashman made his professional debut in an episode of the BBC medical drama Casualty as Damon Roberts. He then made appearances in independent short films including Cenacle (2016), Restraint (2017) and The Manor (2018). In 2018, Ashman joined the cast of the Netflix series Free Rein as Callum. From
February to March 2020, he appeared in four episodes of the BBC soap opera Doctors as Jaime Mallinson. Later that year, Ashman began appearing in the iPlayer thriller series Get Even as Rex. In October 2022, Ashman appeared in another episode of Casualty.

Filmography

Stage
 Chitty Chitty Bang Bang as Jeremy
 The Cryptogram as John
 The Sound of Music as Kurt
 Peter Pan as John Darling
 2000 Feet Away as Boy
 The Visit as Anton Schill
 One Flew Over the Cuckoo's Next as R.P Mc Murphy
 Connected as Mike
 Our House as Lewis
 Rent as Mark
 Cinderella as Prince Charming

References

External links
 

1995 births
21st-century English male actors
Male actors from Buckinghamshire
English male child actors
English male film actors
English male soap opera actors
English male stage actors
Living people
People educated at Tring Park School for the Performing Arts